Abbas Ibrahim or Abass Ibrahim (عباس إبراهيم) may refer to:

 Abbas Ibrahim (politician) (born 1941), Maldivian politician
 Abbas Ibrahim (Lebanese officer) (born 1959), major general and general director of the General Directorate of General Security
 Abbas Ibrahim Zada (born 1970), Afghan politician
 Abass Ibrahim or Abbas Ibrahim (born 1988), Saudi pop singer
 Abbas Ibrahim (footballer) (born 1998), Nigerian footballer